The United States's Emery nuclear test series was a group of 16 nuclear weapons tests conducted in 1970 and 1971. These tests  followed the Operation Mandrel series and preceded the Operation Grommet series.

The underground Baneberry test vented into the atmosphere. For descriptions, see Yucca Flat#Baneberry and List of military nuclear accidents#1970s

References

Explosions in 1970
Explosions in 1971
Emery
1970 in military history
1971 in military history
1970 in Nevada
1971 in Nevada
1971 in the environment